Anssi Neuvonen is a Finnish songwriter, musician and producer. He is best known for being the frontman of indie rock band NEØV.

In addition to his work with NEØV, Neuvonen has played with several Finnish acts including Rubik.

Neuvonen has performed in the music video for ”City Wrecker” by Canadian singer-songwriter Moonface. He has also been a model for the fashion collection by Finnish designer Heikki Salonen.

Neuvonen has a Master of Arts degree from University of Eastern Finland. He wrote his master's thesis on Marcel Proust's art concept.

Discography

NEØV

Albums
Orange Morning (2013, Fullsteam Records)
Dominique (2015, Fullsteam Records, Sony Music Finland)
Volant (2019, Clouds Hill)

Singles
"Windvane" (2012)
"Morning Fire" (2012)
"Mellow" (2013)
"Daydream City" (2013)
"Laketown" (2014)
"The Rain People" (2014)
"Dominique I" (2014)
"Woolen Pumpkin Shirt" (2015)
"Elysion" (2018)
"Person I Used To Be" (2018)
"Lost In Time" (2019)
"Brothers" (2019)

Neufvoin
Robokop EP (2009, New Music Community)
Fake Musket EP (2010, New Music Community)

Featuring
Rubik - Data Bandits EPEPEP (2010, Fullsteam Records)
Rubik - Solar (2011, Fullsteam Records)
The Exploding Eyes Orchestra - I (2015, Svart Records)
Jess and the Ancient Ones - Second Psychedelic Coming: The Aquarius Tapes (2015, Svart Records)
J.Tala - Dustin' Archives Vol. 3 (2018, Music Kickup)

Performing
Heikki Salonen - Headstock (fashion collection) (2013)
Moonface - "City Wrecker" (music video) (2014, Jagjaguwar)

References

Indie rock musicians
Indie pop musicians
Art rock musicians
Finnish rock singers
Finnish rock guitarists
Finnish keyboardists
Finnish songwriters
Rock trumpeters
Year of birth missing (living people)
Living people
Finnish trumpeters
21st-century trumpeters